The 1962 Brisbane Rugby League season was the 54th season of the Brisbane Rugby League premiership. Eight teams from across Brisbane competed for the premiership, which culminated in Northern Suburbs defeating Fortitude Valley 22-0 to claim their fourth consecutive premiership.

Ladder

Finals 

Source:

References 

1962 in rugby league
1962 in Australian rugby league
Rugby league in Brisbane